Katrin Koenning (born 1978) is a German-born Australian photographer, photojournalist and videographer whose work has been exhibited and published since 2007.

Biography 
Koenning was born and grew up in Bochum, a city in North Rhine-Westphalia where she was educated in Steiner school and hiked with the Deutscher Alpenverein youth program. In 2002, aged twenty-five, she moved to Australia where her father and aunt had emigrated in the late 1990s. She studied documentary photography, gaining a Bachelor of Photography with High Distinction at the Queensland College of Art, Griffith University, Brisbane, during which she achieved Academic Excellence Awards in 2004 and 2006, and which she completed in 2007.

In 2009 she moved from Brisbane to live and work in Melbourne, where she is represented by Reading Room Gallery.

Photographer 
Koenning took up photography after the death in a plane crash of a close friend. During 2007 to 2008 she was Picture Editor for Picturing Human Rights and Tell My Story, publications of the Australian PhotoJournalist Magazine and in 2009 to 2010 Editor of their Silent Screams: Rights of the Child. Koenning's photo essays have been published in newspapers and magazines, including The New Yorker, FT Magazine, British Journal of Photography, The Guardian,Human Rights Defender, The New York Times, Der Spiegel, The Independent, and SBS Australia.

Koenning works in series and is globally peripatetic yet adopts "an embedded vantage point [in] an ongoing concern for documenting scarred, wounded, and transitioning landscapes.": Lake Mountain (2010 - 2018) distils into a triptych imagery from return visits over a decade to evidence the effects of the 2009 Black Saturday bushfires; The Crossing (2009 - 2017) is a long-form work in stills and video concerned with human impact on Australian ecology; Pott (2012 - 2018) details indications of post-industrial transition through places and people of Koenning's birthplace the Ruhr; Loraine and the Illusion of Illoura (2010 - 2012) documents road trips in Australia; Transit (2007–2014) featuries portraits of seated travelers lost in thought or sleep; Thirteen: Twenty Lacuna (2009–2011) uses seemingly cinematic, ambient lighting to momentarily spotlight Melbourne city pedestrians; Dear Chris (2012 - 2013) is a personal encounter with the apprehension and aftermath of suicide; the digital video Collisions (2015 - 2017) is compiled from brief fragments from mobile photo footage;  Indefinitely shot between Australia, New Zealand and her native Germany over eight years, presents the condition of a geographically separated family; two series, Midnight in Prahran begun in 2012, and Four Lakes, commenced in Kolkata in 2017, are ongoing location-specific works on urban human interconnectivity; Rausch (2016 - 2018) visually interprets the experience of chronic tinnitus; and her current work Swell is concerned with Australian government interference in, and resistance to, climate activism targeting the Adani company's Carmichael Coal Mine.

Reception
In reviewing The Crossing Ella Mudie identifies Koenning's approach;By returning to the same environments where she situates herself in the landscape, waiting and watching for moments to unfold, Koenning suggests that "it's through immersion that I can be part of a land." What emerges over time from this immersion in place in Koenning's practice is photography as a process of worlding. In The Crossing there is a sense in which each photograph offers a miniature portrait of a natural world on the cusp of disappearance. At the same time, there is ambiguity at play, especially in Koenning's arresting images of fish and bird life hovering between states of appearance and disappearance, or processes of emergence and withdrawal.
The book Astres Noirs, Koenning's first, was the result of distributing her work using social media. On Instagram, Sarker Protick in Bangladesh and Koenning in Australia shared hundreds of photographs. Co-directors of publishers Chose Commune, Cécile Poimboeuf-Koizumi and Vasantha Yogananthan, following the two artists on social networks, noticed artistic affinities in dialogue that banished distance. In their studio in Paris, far removed from Bangladesh and Australia, they developed a book concept that replicated the illumination of the mobile phone screen and its constant flow of imagery;On black paper the pages [are] printed in silver ink with traces of a harsh and blinding light originally generated by the smartphone. Thus, the light of the images is not white, but a metallic gray, paradoxically evoking the essential material of film photography: silver salt. From an all-digital universe, the photographs of Protick and Koenning retain the luminance of the screen thanks to the unusual printing process that transforms them into a malleable material from which the photographic narrative is constructed. Bound in a sort of Japanese fold (each of the pages is double, folded on itself from the top), the book is punctuated with "hidden" images, printed on the inside of the fold.As José Alberto Caro Díaz expresses it;German photographer Katrin Koenning and Bangladesh-based photographer Sarker Protick collaborate despite distance. This work represents photographs taken with a mobile phone camera, capturing the ordinary like a drop of water or a ray of light, and transforming it, discovering an unexplored world [and] show a passion for the world that surrounds them.
Dan Rule introduces an interview with Koenning with a summary of her series Indefinitely
The images that populate Katrin Koenning’s long-running series Indefinitely read as if a syntax of transient moments and fleeting extracts. Shot between Australia, New Zealand and her native Germany over eight years, they waver between the lucid and dreamlike, spanning continents and oceans, cities and forests, crystalline visions and elusive flashes of happenstance. That the Melbourne-based photographer’s family and the vast distances which separate its protagonists underpin Indefinitely says much about these images, which might otherwise seem disparate at a glance.

Photographic educator 
Koenning started her teaching career in Journalism, Journalistic Investigation and Reporting at the University of Queensland in 2008 and has since presented lectures, artist talks, workshops and conference papers in Australia, Bangladesh (2017), Germany (2015, 2018, 2019), Cambodia (2017), New Zealand (2018), and elsewhere.

She has taught in a number of national and international institutions: in 2016 at Anjali Children's workshop, Angkor Photo Festival, Cambodia; at the Australian Centre for Photography Workshop Intensive; Centre for Contemporary Photography, Melbourne (2018), Photo Kathmandu, Nepal (2018); Angkor Photo Workshops, Siem Reap Cambodia (2019); Myanmar Deitta, Yangon Myanmar (2019); University of Tasmania (2020); University of Applied Arts Vienna (2020); Pathshala South Asian Media Institute, Dhaka Bangladesh (2020); and as a lecturer in Bachelor of Arts Photography courses at RMIT University (2020) and Photography Studies College (2013–2017, 2020, 2021)

Recognition 
In the 2011 Head On Portrait Prize Koenning won the Critics Choice Award, selected by Robert McFarlane, for her image, Sleeping Woman for which she shared with Shauna Greyerbiehl, Stephen Dupont and James Brickwood in a prize pool of over $50,000.

In 2016 Koenning's first book, Astres Noirs, received the Australian and New Zealand Photobook of the Year Award, and was shortlisted for both Prix Nadar and the Paris Photo/Aperture First Book Award.

In 2019 she won the William and Winifred Bowness Photography Prize, having been selected as a finalist in 2018 and 2014, when she was also awarded the People's Choice Award. The 14th edition of the Bowness Photography Prize captures the zeitgeist of contemporary Australian photography as a reflection of the broader social and political environment. Anouska Phizacklea, Director of Monash Gallery of Art, in bestowing the 2019 Award remarked that;
Katrin's work speaks with quiet restraint about an issue that will define our generation – the loss of our landscape and the destruction of our planet. It is a powerful reflection on an intense event that left our bush in cinders and took a horrific toll on communities with the loss of so many loved ones. The 2009 Black Saturday bushfires left an indelible mark on Victorians and its memory is a stark reminder of the frailty of our communities and the environment, and our susceptibility to extreme weather events as our climate changes. We are delighted that this work will join MGA's permanent collection.

Chris Saines, Director of Queensland Art Gallery/Gallery of Modern Art confirmed that "Koenning's eloquent requiem for Lake Mountain is a remarkably composed and restrained but still urgent and insistent cri de coeur. It asks us to reflect on the terms of our coexistence with nature, and their sustainability, in an age of environmental crisis." Annika Lems describes Katrin Koenning's photographs as "a landscape of intimate moments".

Del Barrett, previously vice president of the Royal Photographic Society, and Katherine Riley in noting Koenning's inclusion in Hundred+Heroines, an independent charity founded by Barrett, cite her series Swell; a protest against the Australian government's restrictions on green activism, and her distinctive "intuitive, experimental" yet still documentary, approach.

Awards 

 2010:  Troika Editions Format Exposure Prize, London
 2011: Capture magazine Emerging Photographer of the Year Award Photojournalism/documentary
 2011: HeadOn Portrait Prize, Critic's Choice Award, selected by Robert McFarlane
 2012:  JGS Award, Forward Thinking Museum
 2014:  Merit Award, Moreton Bay Region Art Award
 2014:  People's Choice, Bowness Photography Prize
 2015:  Daylight Photo Award
 2016:  Conscientious Portfolio Competition
 2017:  Australian Photobook of the Year Award
 2019:  Bowness Photography Prize

Exhibitions

Solo 
 2012:  From a Changed North, HeadOn Photo Festival, MiCK Gallery, Sydney Australia
 2012:  Loraine and the Illusion of Illoura..., Forward Thinking Museum
 2012:  Near, Brisbane Powerhouse, Brisbane Australia
 2013:  Dear Chris, officially opened by Helen Ennis, Edmund Pearce Gallery, Melbourne Australia
 2013:  Loraine and the Illusion of Illoura, Colour Factory, Melbourne Australia
 2014:  Dear Chris, Wallflower Photomedia Gallery, Mildura Australia
 2015:  Indefinitely, Photobook Melbourne, James Makin Gallery, Melbourne Australia
 2015:  Indefinitely, Athens Photo Festival, Greece
 2015:  Fieber, PhotoIreland, Ireland
 2015:  Indefinitely, Wallflower Photomedia Gallery, Mildura Australia
 2016:  Indefinitely, The Lost Ones Gallery, Ballarat Australia
 2016:  Indefinitely, Daylight Project Space, Hillsborough USA
 2017:  Dear Chris, Chobi Mela Festival, Dhaka Bangladesh
 2017:  Indefinitely, Organ Vida Festival, Galerija Kranjčar, Zagreb Croatia (Supported by Goethe-Institut and the Australian Embassy)
 2017:  Astres Noirs, Paris Photo | East Wing Gallery, Paris France
 2018:  The Crossing, Hamburg Triennial of Photography, Deichtorhallen Hamburg, Germany
 2018:  The Crossing, Le Cloître ouvert 222 rue du Faubourg Saint-Honoré 75008 Paris
 2019:  Swell, Monash Gallery of Art, Melbourne Australia
 2019:  The Crossing, Myanmar Deitta, Yangon Myanmar
 2019:  the kids are in trouble, Reading Room, Melbourne
 2021:  Tisseurs d'Images, German Influences, Angers, France
 2021:  the kids are in trouble, Chennai Photo Biennale, India

Group 
Koenning's participation in group exhibitions includes;

 2016 - The Crossing, CCP Declares: On the Social Contract, Centre for Contemporary Photography, Melbourne Australia
 2016 - The Crossing, Transfer, Australian Centre for Photography, Sydney Australia

Publications

Further reading

Collections 
Koenning's work is held in the following permanent collections:
 Monash Gallery of Art
 Daryl Hewson Queensland and Australian Photography Collection

References

External links
 Katrin Koenning website

German emigrants to Australia
1978 births
Australian women photographers
Photography academics
21st-century Australian women artists
Australian photojournalists
Living people
Women photojournalists